Danijel Dežmar (born 31 March 1988) is a Slovenian footballer who plays for SK Kirchbach.

References

External links
PrvaLiga profile 

1988 births
Living people
Sportspeople from Novo Mesto
Slovenian footballers
Association football defenders
NK Krka players
NK Krško players
NK Primorje players
NK Ivančna Gorica players
Slovenian Second League players
Slovenian PrvaLiga players
Slovenian expatriate footballers
Slovenian expatriate sportspeople in Austria
Expatriate footballers in Austria